The Karachi International Book Fair is an annual book fair held in Karachi, Pakistan. It is the largest book fair in the country, preceding the Lahore International Book Fair. It provides a platform where publishers, booksellers, agents, cultural organisations and press can meet, exchange ideas and identify business opportunities. It has been organised by the Pakistan Publishers and Booksellers Association.

It is held annually at the Karachi Expo Centre grounds in Karachi, Sindh, Pakistan. In most years, it has been held in December, with the exceptions of 2014 and 2015, when it took place in November. No fair was held in 2020.

The Karachi International Book Fair forms a part of Pakistan Publishers and Booksellers Association strategy to transform Karachi into a major centre in the publishing world.

The Karachi International Book Fair brings together the Asian and international publishing communities. The fair provides access to publishers in the Asia, and is an important event in the negotiation and sale of book rights and licensing.

References

External links
Home page for the KIBF

Book fairs in Pakistan
Events in Karachi